Ľubomír Korijkov (born 12 January 1993) is a Slovak football defender who plays for Slávia TU Košice.

Club career

MFK Košice
He made his debut for Košice during a 4–2 home Corgoň Liga win against Nitra, coming on as a 77th minute substitute for Peter Šinglár.

Private life
As of 2022, Korijkov also works in real estates, while he competes at a semi-professional level. Korijkov is of Bulgarian descent from his paternal side.

External links

Uefa profile
Eurofotbal profile

References

1993 births
Living people
Slovak people of Bulgarian descent
Sportspeople from Košice
Slovak footballers
Association football defenders
FC VSS Košice players
MFK Zemplín Michalovce players
FC Lokomotíva Košice players
Partizán Bardejov players
FK Slavoj Trebišov players
Slávia TU Košice players
Slovak Super Liga players
2. Liga (Slovakia) players
3. Liga (Slovakia) players
Regionalliga players
Expatriate footballers in Germany
Slovak expatriate sportspeople in Germany